Platycheirus granditarsus is a species of hoverfly. It is found in many parts of Britain and Europe. Typical habitat includes marshy meadows and ditches, where it can be found between May and October, though it is at its commonest between July and September. The most distinctive feature of this fly is the red-orange abdomen most easily seen as it takes off or alights.

Description
External images
For terms see Morphology of Diptera Tergites 2-4 are largely red (hind corners of tergites 2 and 3 are black in females). Male metatarsus is dilated and with an inward protuberance. It has blackish wings.
See references for determination.

Distribution
Palearctic: Fennoscandia south to France and the Alps, Ireland east through Northern Europe and Central Europe into European Russia then across Siberia and the Russian Far East to the Pacific coast. Nearctic: Alaska to Quebec and south to Colorado.

Biology
Habitat: humid grassland subject to flooding, marsh, fen, edges of raised bogs. Flies May to September.

It flies May to August.

References

Diptera of Europe
Syrphinae
Insects described in 1771
Taxa named by Johann Reinhold Forster